Adam's Apple is the tenth album by post-bop jazz artist Wayne Shorter. Recorded in 1966 and released in 1967, it included the first recording of his composition "Footprints", later recorded by the Miles Davis Quintet for the album Miles Smiles (1967). Shorter is featured with pianist Herbie Hancock, bassist Reggie Workman and drummer Joe Chambers. The CD release includes the Hancock composition "The Collector" (also known as "Teo's Bag") as a bonus track.

Reception
Writing in Jazz Journal, Mark Gardner urged readers, "For goodness sake don’t miss this one." Gardner called the record "a tour de force for Shorter the soloist as distinct from Shorter the composer."

A retrospective AllMusic review by Stacia Proefrock states, "it really does rank with the best of his output from this incredibly fertile period. Taken in isolation, this is one of the great works of mid-'60s jazz, but when Shorter has already achieved a unique performance style, compositional excellence, and a perfectly balanced relationship with his sidemen, it is hard to be impressed by the fact that he manages to continue to do these things album after album."

Track listing
All compositions by Wayne Shorter except where noted.

 "Adam's Apple" – 6:49
 "502 Blues (Drinkin' and Drivin')" (Jimmy Rowles) – 6:34
 "El Gaucho" – 6:30
 "Footprints" – 7:29
 "Teru" – 6:12
 "Chief Crazy Horse" – 7:34
 "The Collector" (Herbie Hancock) – 6:54 Bonus track on CD reissue

Recorded on February 3 (#1) and February 24 (all others), 1966.

Personnel
Wayne Shorter – tenor saxophone
Herbie Hancock – piano
Reggie Workman – bass
Joe Chambers – drums

Charts

References

External links 
 Wayne Shorter - Adam's Apple (1967) album releases & credits at Discogs
 Wayne Shorter - Adam's Apple (1967) album to be listened on Spotify

1967 albums
Blue Note Records albums
Wayne Shorter albums
Albums produced by Alfred Lion
Albums recorded at Van Gelder Studio